2022 World Masters Athletics Championships is the 24th in a series of World Masters Athletics Outdoor Championships that took place in Tampere,

Finland,

from 29 June to 10 July 2022.

The main venue was Ratinan Stadion (Tampere Stadium).

Supplemental venues include Hervannan keskusurheilukenttä (Hervanta Sports Field), Pyynikin urheilukenttä (Pyynikki Sports Field), Tampere Exhibition and Sports Centre (TESC) for throwing events, and Pyynikki Ridge for Cross Country.

This edition was originally scheduled for 20 July to 1 August 2020 in Toronto, Canada,

but that was cancelled due to the COVID-19 pandemic and rescheduled.

This Championships is organized by World Masters Athletics (WMA) in coordination with a Local Organising Committee (LOC): Juha Yli-Rajala (City of Tampere), Harri Aalto (Finnish Athletics).

The WMA is the global governing body of the sport of athletics for athletes 35 years of age or older, setting rules for masters athletics competition.

A full range of track and field events were held.

In addition, non-stadia events will include 8K Cross Country, 10K Race Walk, 20K Race Walk and Half Marathon.

Medal table 
Top ten nations

References

External links

World Masters Athletics Championships
World Masters Athletics Championships
Sports competitions in Tampere
International athletics competitions hosted by Finland
World Masters Athletics Championships
World Masters Athletics Championships
World Masters Athletics Championships
Masters athletics (track and field) records